Going, Going... is the ninth studio album by English rock band The Wedding Present. It was released on 2 September 2016 in the UK, and 2 December 2016 in the US, by their record label, Scopitones.  It is a 20-song double multimedia album - each song has its own video included - that is also a travelogue about a journey across North America.

Background 
Going, Going... came four years after the band's previous album, Valentina. David Gedge had decided that he didn't want the next album to be "just another album" and decided on a format of a number of interconnected pieces.  In 2014 he travelled across America with photographer Jessica McMillan and made a number of films.  After that, says Gedge, it was a case of "progressing through the music, trying all sorts of ideas, seeing how they work set against the visuals."

Track listing

Personnel
The Wedding Present
David Gedge - vocals, guitar, mellotron, waterphone
Samuel Beer-Pearce - guitars, keyboards, vocals
Katharine Wallinger - bass, backing vocals
Charles Layton - drums, percussion
with:
Teo Benson - violin
Terry de Castro - vocals
Steve Fisk - keyboards
Annie Ford - viola
Paul Hiraga - vocals on "Marblehead"
Barb Hunter - cello
Melanie Howard - vocals on "Marblehead"
Jae-In Shin - violin
Brix Smith Start - vocals on "Greenland"
Andrew Teilo - vocals on "Wales"

References

2016 albums
The Wedding Present albums